Henry Harold Waller (20 August 1917 – April 1984) was an English professional footballer who played as a wing half.

Career
Waller began his career in non-league football with Ashington, signing for Arsenal in 1937. He made eight appearances in the Football League for Arsenal during the 1946–47 season. Waller also made 17 league appearances for Leyton Orient, before returning to Ashington.

References

1917 births
1984 deaths
English footballers
Ashington A.F.C. players
Arsenal F.C. players
Leyton Orient F.C. players
English Football League players
Association football wing halves